Langebæk is a town with a population of 248 (1 January 2022), which until 1 January 2007 was the main town of the former Langebæk municipality (Danish, kommune) in Region Sjælland on the southeastern tip of the island of Zealand (Sjælland) in south Denmark. It had a total population of 6,332 in 2005. Its last mayor was Henrik Holmer, a member of the Social Democrats (Socialdemokraterne) political party.

To the east is Hølen, a strait separating Zealand from the island of Nyord, and then further south is Stege Bay (Stege Bugt), which is the main body of water separating the former municipality from the next major island to the southwest, the island of Møn. At the narrowest point between the two islands to the south of Langebæk, the waters are named Wolf Strait (Ulvsund). There are a number of islands in the waters between Zealand and Møn, including the islands of Langø, Tærø and Lilleø.

The Queen Alexandrine Bridge connects the former municipality, and the island of Zealand, to Møn at the town of Kalvehave.

On 1 January 2007 Langebæk municipality ceased to exist, owing to Kommunalreformen ("The Municipality Reform" of 2007). It was merged with Møn, Præstø, and Vordingborg municipalities to form an enlarged Vordingborg municipality.

External links
 Vordingborg municipality's official website (Danish only)

References

 Municipal statistics: NetBorger Kommunefakta, delivered from KMD aka Kommunedata (Municipal Data)
 Municipal mergers and neighbors: Eniro new municipalities map

Cities and towns in Region Zealand
Former municipalities of Denmark
Vordingborg Municipality